Bikasha is a genus of flea beetles in the family Chrysomelidae. There are 19 described species from the Seychelles and the Oriental realm.

Species
The genus contains 19 described species:
 Bikasha antennata (Chen, 1934)
 Bikasha atra (Medvedev, 1992)
 Bikasha collaris (Baly, 1877)
 Bikasha fortipunctata Maulik, 1931
 Bikasha intermedia (Chen, 1934)
 Bikasha lankana (Medvedev, 2001)
 Bikasha laosensis (Medvedev, 2000)
 Bikasha major (Kimoto, 2001)
 Bikasha manilensis (Medvedev, 1993)
 Bikasha minor Maulik, 1931
 Bikasha minuta (Chen, 1934)
 Bikasha nepalica (Medvedev, 2007)
 Bikasha nigripes (Medvedev, 2016)
 Bikasha nipponica (Chujo, 1959)
 Bikasha pallida (Medvedev, 1994)
 Bikasha puncticollis (Medvedev, 1993)
 Bikasha simplicithorax (Chen, 1934)
 Bikasha tenuipunctata Maulik, 1931
 Bikasha violaceipennis (Medvedev, 1992)

References

Chrysomelidae genera
Alticini
Beetles of Africa
Beetles of Asia